Christopher Clark (born 1960) is an Australian historian.

Christopher Clark may also refer to:

 Christopher H. Clark (1767–1828), Virginia congressman and lawyer
 Christopher F. Clark (born 1953), American historian

See also
 Christopher Clarke (judge) (born 1947), English judge
 Chris Clark (disambiguation)
 Chris Clarke (disambiguation)